The Monkey Talks is a 1927 American silent drama film directed by Raoul Walsh and written by Malcolm Stuart Boylan and Elizabeth Pickett Chevalier. The film stars Olive Borden, Jacques Lerner, Don Alvarado, Malcolm Waite, Raymond Hitchcock and Ted McNamara. The film was released on February 20, 1927, by Fox Film Corporation.

Cast
Olive Borden as Olivette
Jacques Lerner as Jocko Lerner
Don Alvarado as Sam Wick
Malcolm Waite as Bergerin
Raymond Hitchcock as Lorenzo
Ted McNamara as Firmin
Jane Winton as Masisie
August Tollaire as Mata

References

External links
 
 
  The Monkey Talks at silentera.com

1927 films
1920s English-language films
Fox Film films
Silent American drama films
1927 drama films
Films directed by Raoul Walsh
American black-and-white films
American films based on plays
American silent feature films
1920s American films